Since 2010, Fashion Week producers in New York, London, Paris and Vancouver have pushed to expand the realm of Fashion Week by creating a separate Fashion Week (weekend or day) for menswear fashion designers and retail brands.  Los Angeles is the 5th in the world to develop a Fashion Week for menswear, succeeding New York, London, Paris and Vancouver.

During Men's Fashion Week LA (MFWLA), menswear fashion designers and retail brands present their latest collections to industry insiders—press, media, bloggers, buyers, stylists, high-profile guests and fashion occult. Men's Fashion Week LA is held twice a year: January (Autumn/Winter); and June (Spring/Summer).  The one-week event is held a few days preceding the traditional (women's) Los Angeles Fashion Week.
  
Men's Fashion Week Los Angeles was created to provide a platform for the evolving menswear apparel segment.  MFWLA fuses fashion week runway shows, trade show style exhibits and market week type custom pop-up showrooms.  Men's Fashion Week Los Angeles’ calendar is generally composed of designer runway shows, one department store showcase, one emerging talent student showcase, launch parties and the like. MFWLA also features press installations.

Additional amenities found at Men's Fashion Week LA are a “Gentry Suite”, “Cigar Lounge”, “Pop-Up Barber Shop”, “Gaming Suite” and a “Bow Tie Technique Suite”.

To reflect the original working-name, “Gentlemen’s Week”, a bow tie was linked to the company logo.  The bow tie personifies MFWLA's company philosophy, which (as indicated by the company website) was founded on honor and civility among aesthete gentlemen.

External links
Official website

Fashion events in the United States
Events in Los Angeles
Annual events in Los Angeles County, California
Recurring events established in 2010
2010 establishments in California
Fashion weeks
Men's culture